The New-England Repertory was a newspaper published from 1803 through 1820.

It was first published in Newburyport, Massachusetts, but was moved to Boston in 1804 and renamed The Repertory.  It was published under this name and The Repertory & General Advertiser until 1820.

References

 Brigham, Clarence S. "Bibliography of American Newspapers, 1690-1820 Part III: Maryland To Massachusetts(Boston)" Proceedings of the American Antiquarian Society 25(1):128-293. 1915 

Publications established in 1803
Newspapers published in Boston
Defunct newspapers published in Massachusetts